Wojciech Smarzowski (born 18 January 1963 in Korczyna near Krosno) is a Polish screenwriter and director. He studied filmmaking at the Jagiellonian University and the National Film School in Łódź (1990). His 2004 film, The Wedding (not to be confused with the Andrzej Wajda film of the same title) earned special jury mention at the Karlovy Vary International Film Festival in 2005. He began his film career as a video camera operator.

Smarzowski’s film Róża gained the Polish Film Award in seven categories in 2011. His film Traffic Department (2013) tells the story of seven policemen from Warsaw - colleagues and good friends whose lives change after one of them dies in mysterious circumstances. It competed in the main competition section of the 35th Moscow International Film Festival.

Kler (2018) was described by Anne Applebaum in The Washington Post as "a searing, painful film that condemns the Polish Catholic Church as corrupt and hypocritical". In its first weekend after opening, it broke box-office records in Poland and, after three weeks had been seen by 3 million people, about 10% of Poland's population.

Filmography

Feature films

Director and screenwriter 
Sezon na leszcza, 2000 - screenwriter only
The Wedding (Wesele), 2004 
The Dark House (Dom zły), 2009 
Rose (Róża), 2011 - director only
Traffic Department (Drogówka), 2013 
The Mighty Angel (Pod Mocnym Aniołem), 2014
Volhynia (Wołyń), 2016
Clergy (Kler), 2018
The Wedding (Wesele), 2021

Television

Director 
Małżowina, 1998 - TV movie
Kuracja, 2001 - Teleplay
Na Wspólnej, 2003-2008 - TV series (125 episodes)
Klucz, 2004 - Teleplay
Cztery kawałki tortu, 2006 - Teleplay
BrzydUla, 2008-2009 - TV series (25 episodes)
The Londoners - TV series (8 episodes)
Bez tajemnic, 2013 - TV series (7 episodes)

See also
Cinema of Poland

References

External links
 
 Wojciech Smarzowski at Culture.pl

1963 births
Living people
Jagiellonian University alumni
Łódź Film School alumni
Polish film directors
Polish screenwriters
People from Krosno County
Polish atheists